In mathematical logic, an effective Polish space is a complete separable metric space that has a computable presentation. Such spaces are studied in effective descriptive set theory and in constructive analysis.  In particular, standard examples of Polish spaces such as the  real line, the Cantor set and the Baire space are all effective Polish spaces.

Definition 

An effective Polish space is a complete separable metric space X with metric d such that there is a countable dense set C = (c0, c1,...) that makes the following two relations on  computable (Moschovakis 2009:96-7):

References 

Yiannis N. Moschovakis, 2009, Descriptive Set Theory, 2nd edition, American Mathematical Society. 

Computable analysis
Effective descriptive set theory
Computability theory